Allies is a term referring to individuals, groups or nations that have joined together in an association for mutual benefit or to achieve some common purpose.

Allies may also refer to:
 Allies of World War I
 Allies of World War II
 French and British forces in the Crimean War
 Straight allies, people who identify as heterosexual and who support equal civil rights for the LBGTQ community
 Allies (band), a popular 1980s era Contemporary Christian music group featuring Bob Carlisle
 Allies (Crosby, Stills & Nash album), 1983
 Allies (Fred Frith album), 1996
 "Allies" (Stargate Atlantis), a Stargate Atlantis episode
 "Allies" (song), the sixth track on the album Passionworks by Heart
 The Allies (Australian rules football), a representative Australian rules football team
 Allies (film), a 2014 British war film
 Allies, a 2010 Star Wars novel in the Fate of the Jedi series
 Allies, a 2019 novel by Alan Gratz.

See also
 Allie (disambiguation)
 Allied (disambiguation)
 Ally (disambiguation)
 Allied Forces (disambiguation)
 Allied Powers (disambiguation)
 Alley